Vilas Ghogre (1 June 1947 – 15 July 1997) was a prominent Dalit activist, poet, and artist from Bombay who committed suicide in protest against the 1997 Ramabai killings in which 10 Dalits were killed by Maharashtra State Reserve Police Force and 26 were injured.  He is featured prominently in Anand Patwardhan's documentaries Bombay Our City (1985) Jai Bhim Comrade (2011) .

References 

Dalit writers
Marathi-language poets
Dalit leaders
1947 births
1997 deaths
Activists from Maharashtra
Poets from Maharashtra
20th-century Indian poets